Unilalianism (/junɨˈleɪ.li.ən.ɪzəm/), better known as Unilalia is a portmanteau combining the Latin unus with the ancient Greek laliá – together, this word is translated loosely into "one tongue [language]". It refers to a growing, new underground art and aesthetic movement created by Carter Wilson and his brother, Ellis, developing in the Seattle and greater Puget Sound region with its roots in Oakland, California.

List of Unilalian shows 
This is a list of shows of Unilalianism.

 Washington
 2019 - Live Installation 001 (Olympia)
 2019 - Live Installation 002 (Olympia)
 2019 - Carter Wilson Album Release Celebration & Cafe Red Benefit Show (Seattle)
2019 - Unilalia Live! 001 (Seattle)
 2019 - Unilalia Live! 002 (Seattle)
 2019 - Unilalia Live! 003 (Olympia)
2020 - Unilalia Live! 004: Blackbox Underground (Ballard)
2020 - Unilalia Pop-Up Show (Seattle)
2020 - Unilalia Live! 005 (Seattle)
2020 - Unilalia Live! 006 (Seattle)

References

External links 
The Unilalia Group

https://www.iheart.com/podcast/269-hhhnast-52465442/episode/dj-blake-interviews-carter-and-ellis-52471398/

American artist groups and collectives
Art and design organizations
Art societies
Indigenous art of the Americas
Afrofuturism
Counterculture